The Mountaineers women's cricket team is a Zimbabwean women's cricket team based in Mutare. They compete in the Fifty50 Challenge and the Women's T20 Cup. They won the inaugural edition of the Fifty50 Challenge in 2020–21.

History
The team were formed in 2020, to compete in Zimbabwe's two new women's domestic competitions: the Fifty50 Challenge and the Women's T20 Cup. In the Women's T20 Cup, the side finished third in the group stage, winning two of their six matches. In the Fifty50 Challenge, the side topped the group with four wins from their six matches to qualify for the final.  In the final, they restricted Rhinos to 210 all out, before winning by 62 runs via the Duckworth–Lewis–Stern method, with Chipo Mugeri-Tiripano making 85. Mountaineers bowler Francesca Chipare was the leading wicket-taker in the tournament.

In 2021–22, they finished bottom of the group stage of the Fifty50 Challenge, but reached the final of the Women's T20 Cup, before losing to defending champions Eagles.

Players

Current squad
Based on appearances in the 2021–22 season. Players in bold have international caps.

Seasons

Fifty50 Challenge

Women's T20 Cup

Honours
 Fifty50 Challenge:
 Winners (1): 2020–21
 Women's T20 Cup:
 Winners (0): 
 Best finish: 2021–22 (Runners-up)

See also
 Mountaineers cricket team

References

Women's cricket teams in Zimbabwe